Grammostola porteri, also known as the common Rose hair tarantula or Chilean tarantula, is a frequently encountered species in the modern keeping hobby. Grammostola porteri are considered mostly docile but individuality and temperament between specimens varies greatly based on an array of factors. This species gains much of its notoriety from its large size and low maintenance, while also being relatively inexpensive. This animal was one of the first introduced arachnids in the wildlife trade so they are popular as pets. This tarantula is endemic to Chile.

In captivity, this animal should be kept with relatively deep substrate, foliage, a water dish and a starter burrow.

Grammostola porteri is a species of tarantula described in 1936.

References

Theraphosidae
Endemic fauna of Chile
Spiders of South America
Taxa named by Cândido Firmino de Mello-Leitão
Spiders described in 1936